Heart of Midnight is a fantasy horror novel by J. Robert King, set in the world of Ravenloft, and based on the Dungeons & Dragons game.

Plot summary
Heart of Midnight is a novel in which Casimir seeks revenge on the meistersinger of Harmonia who was responsible for the death of Casimir's mother.

Reception

Reviews
Kliatt
Review by Baird Searles (1993) in Asimov's Science Fiction, June 1993

References

1992 American novels
Ravenloft novels